In enzymology, a hydroxylamine reductase (NADH) is an enzyme that catalyzes the chemical reaction.

NH3 + NAD+ + H2O  hydroxylamine + NADH + H+

The 3 substrates of this enzyme are NH3, NAD+, and H2O, whereas its 3 products are hydroxylamine, NADH, and H+.

This enzyme belongs to the family of oxidoreductases, specifically those acting on other nitrogenous compounds as donors with NAD+ or NADP+ as acceptor.  The systematic name of this enzyme class is ammonium:NAD+ oxidoreductase. Other names in common use include hydroxylamine reductase, ammonium dehydrogenase, NADH-hydroxylamine reductase, N-hydroxy amine reductase, hydroxylamine reductase (NADH2), and NADH2:hydroxylamine oxidoreductase.  This enzyme participates in nitrogen metabolism.

References

 
 
 

EC 1.7.1
NADH-dependent enzymes
Enzymes of unknown structure